Melbourne Victory Football Club Youth is the youth system of Melbourne Victory based in Melbourne, Victoria. The team plays in the National Premier Leagues, the second level of Australia's soccer pyramid in Australia. The club also competes in the under-23s Y-League competition.

Youth team history
The team was founded in 2008, as a Melbourne Victory representative team for the inaugural season of the National Youth League competition, along with six other youth squads, and finished a disappointing sixth. The development side has had three managers, Mehmet Durakovic, who was promoted to manager of the senior squad in 2011, and current managers Darren Davies and John Aloisi. Davies led the youth side to its first silverware victory in winning the premiership plate, finishing first on the National Youth League ladder in the 2012-13 season. It would be current club chairman Anthony Di Pietro's first silverware victory as well.
On 7 November 2014, it was confirmed that the team would compete in the National Premier Leagues Victoria 1 competition for 2015 season onwards. Victory managed promotion at their first attempt, placing second in the NPL1 East division, going on to beat Moreland Zebras FC in the qualification playoff and then North Geelong Warriors FC in the promotion playoff. For the club's first season in the top tier of football in Victorian state football, Matt Hennessey and Ryan Lambert were signed from Hume City FC and Richmond SC respectively.

Youth/NPL current squad

Current staff

Honours
Youth
La Ionica Community Cup
Winners (1): 2015

National Premier Leagues Victoria 2 Premiership
Runners-up (1): 2015

Under-23s
Y-League Premiership
Premiers (1): 2012–13

Academy
National Premier Leagues Victoria U-20 Premiership
Premiers (1): 2015

National Premier Leagues Victoria 2 U-20 Premiership
Premiers (2): 2017, 2019
Runners-up (1): 2018

National Premier Leagues Victoria U-18 Premiership
Premiers (1): 2019

Stadiums
The team play their home matches at Epping Stadium in Melbourne's northern suburb of Epping. The stadium has a total capacity of 10,000, with a single grandstand of approximately 1,000 seats. Past venues used as a home ground by the club have been South Melbourne FC home ground Lakeside Stadium in Albert Park, Bentleigh Greens' Kingston Heath in Cheltenham and Northcote City's John Cain Memorial Reserve in Thornbury; however, with the side now competing the top division of Victorian football, along with all three of these sides, ground-sharing with any of the sides was not a preferred option, with Epping Stadium providing the club with the facilities required. The team has also played competitive matches at Victory's senior team home venues, AAMI Park and Etihad Stadium.

Former players
This is a list of former Melbourne Victory Youth players, who have played at least 20 A-League competitive matches for the first team.

Bold denotes players still playing in Melbourne Victory
Appearances only consist of competitive domestic league appearances

Managerial history

See also

 Melbourne Victory FC
 Melbourne Victory FC (W-League)

References

External links
 Official website

Melbourne Victory FC
Soccer clubs in Melbourne
Association football clubs established in 2008
2008 establishments in Australia
A-League National Youth League
Sport in the City of Whittlesea